The Nikoides are a genus in the Processidae family of shrimp, first described in 1875 by Otton Mikhailovich Paulson.

In Australia it is found off the northern coasts of Western Australia, the Northern Territory, and Queensland.

Species accepted by WoRMS are:

 Nikoides boraboraensis Burukovsky, 2002
 Nikoides danae Paulson, 1875
 Nikoides gurneyi Hayashi, 1975
 Nikoides longicarpus Noël, 1986
 Nikoides maldivensis Borradaile, 1915
 Nikoides multispinatus Hayashi, 1981
 Nikoides plantei Burukovsky, 2007
 Nikoides schmitti Manning & Chace, 1971
 Nikoides sibogae De Man, 1918
 Nikoides steinii (Edmondson, 1935)
 Nikoides subdistalis Komai & Hirabayashi, 2021

References

Caridea
Decapod genera